Picong or Piquant is light comical banter, usually at someone else's expense. It is the way in which West Indians (particularly those in the Eastern Caribbean) tease, heckle and mock each other in a friendly manner. However, the line between humour and insult is fine and constantly shifting, and at times the convivial spirit may degenerate into more heated debate and perhaps, physical altercations. The ability to engage in picong without crossing over into insult is highly valued in the culture of calypso music.

Playwright Steve Carter, who wrote an award-winning play of the same name, describes pecong as a "verbal battle of insults hurled in rhymed verse."

See also
 Avoidance speech (mother-in-law languages)
 Call and response
 Diss track
 The dozens
 Extempo
 Mother insult
 Roast (comedy)
 Wolf ticket
 My Wife and Kids
 Calypso War / Extempo / Picong

References

Trinidad and Tobago culture
Caribbean culture